Treherne is an unincorporated urban community in the Municipality of Norfolk Treherne within the Canadian province of Manitoba that held town status prior to January 1, 2015. It is halfway between Winnipeg and Brandon on Provincial Highway 2. Primarily a farming community, Treherne has a significant portion of the municipality's population, which is around 1750 people, and has two schools (Treherne Elementary School and Treherne Collegiate Institute) and a hospital.  There is also a daycare facility, and in 2006 Treherne opened the Treherne Aquatic Centre next to a campground facility.

Treherne is named for George Treherne, an early settler.

Treherne hosts the annual "Run for the Hills" marathon each fall with the course winding through the Tiger Hills. A popular tourist attraction in Treherne consists of a glass bottle house, chapel, wishing well, and outhouse, built by local residents Bob Cain and Fred Harp. Treherne also has a museum, which exhibits an extensive antique gun collection and a mini indoor village.

Demographics 

References

External links 
 Official website

Designated places in Manitoba
Former towns in Manitoba
Populated places disestablished in 2015
2015 disestablishments in Manitoba